The Baltimore City Senate Delegation is an association of the six state senators who represent Baltimore City in the Maryland General Assembly.

Authority and responsibilities
The Baltimore City Senate Delegation is responsible for representing the interests, needs and concerns of the City of Baltimore in the Maryland General Assembly.  The first priority has been to ensure that sufficient state funds are granted to the city to support the funding of education and the construction and operation of public school facilities.  Additionally, the delegation monitors state transportation trust funds allocated to the city for its transportation infrastructure.  Every year, the Mayor of Baltimore provides of list of special projects that need to be funded through state loans (bonds); the Baltimore City Senate Delegation is responsible for passage of those projects in the General Assembly.

Current members

References

 
Delegations in the Maryland General Assembly